Helen McCarthy (born 27 February 1951) is the British author of such anime reference books as 500 Manga Heroes and Villains, Anime!, The Anime Movie Guide and Hayao Miyazaki: Master of Japanese Animation. She is the co-author of The Erotic Anime Movie Guide and the exhaustive The Anime Encyclopedia with Jonathan Clements. She also designs needlework and textile art.

Background
McCarthy was the first English-speaking author to write a book about anime, in addition to being "the first person in the United Kingdom to run an anime programme at a convention, start a dedicated anime newsletter, and edit a dedicated anime magazine."

In 1991, she founded Anime UK magazine, and in 1992 became one of the principal contributors to Super Play, an SNES title with a heavy anime and manga bias. Anime UK became Anime FX after a change of backer and closed at the end of 1996. Andy Frain of Manga Entertainment, then the most influential anime distributor in Britain, took issue with the magazine's editorial policy and later with its involvement in the campaign against the trademarking of the word "manga", but this did not affect either McCarthy's position or the magazine's publication. She also contributed to Manga Mania magazine, and after Anime UK closed she edited it from 1997 to 1998. She has also written on anime and manga for British magazines and newspapers including the Daily Telegraph, NEO, SFX and ImagineFX.

McCarthy was able to apply her convention-running knowledge gained in SF and media fandom when Anime UK ran the successful one-day convention AUKcon, which attracted attendees from all over Europe in 1994. She has written numerous articles and essays and is a frequent convention guest, as well as speaking at film festivals and academic gatherings in Europe, America and Japan. She has curated and delivered four successful seasons of lectures and screenings at the Barbican Cinema in London. In September 2008 she curated and presented a week-long film season and exhibition to mark the 80th anniversary of the birth of Osamu Tezuka, also at the Barbican. The season featured London's first professional Japanese kamishibai performance. Her relationship with the Barbican continues with a further anime film season, Anime's Human Machines, to be presented in September 2019 as part of the Life Rewired project.

She has also been a guest speaker at the University of Maryland, and at Akita International University. She is a founder member of the Fandom and NeoMedia Studies Association (FANS), gave the keynote address at their inaugural conference, and spoke at their first Japanese symposium at Yamanushi Gakuin in 2017.

McCarthy is interested in the many crossing points and influences between anime, manga and other arts. Manga Cross-Stitch, a guide to using the visual grammar of anime and manga to create original needlework designs, appeared in 2009. Artist Steve Kyte provided many of the designs in the book, the rest being created by McCarthy. She has since expanded her needlework activities with workshops for the Japan Foundation and at conventions. Her interest in the history and artistic potential of textiles led to contributions to the Future Beauty: 30 Years of Japanese Fashion exhibition at the Barbican, including a catalogue essay, and to presentations on the history of cosplay. She worked with choreographer Sidi Larbi Cherkaoui and his team on TeZuKa at Sadler's Wells in 2011, and on Pluto at the Barbican in 2017 and in European City of Culture Leeuwarden in 2018. Also in 2018, she presented on 2.5D Theatre at the Daiwa Japan Foundation alongside Alexandra Rutter of Whole Hog Theatre.

A firm believer that artistic and creative talent can be developed and enjoyed by everyone, she has edited two how-to-draw manuals for Flame Tree Press.

Provoked by copyright infringement of her work in 2010, she has spoken and blogged about the impact of intellectual property theft on authors, and on creators' rights to decide how, when and where their work will be published. She supports legitimate sharing through Creative Commons.

Awards
 2010: winner of a Harvey Award for The Art of Osamu Tezuka: God of Manga.
 2010: nominated for an Eisner Award for The Art of Osamu Tezuka: God of Manga.
 2008: Great Britain Sasakawa Foundation/Authors' Foundation award for research into Japanese animation and comics.
 2006: IMAF Award for Outstanding Achievement in Anime and Manga, sponsored by the International Manga and Anime Foundation.
 1997: Japan Festival Award for work in promoting understanding of Japanese culture in Britain, from the Japan Foundation.

Publications
 Manga Manga Manga, A Celebration of Japanese Animation at the ICA pub Island World Communications (London) 1992. 
 Anime! A Beginners Guide To Japanese Animation pub. Titan (London) 1993. 
 The Anime Movie Guide: Japanese Animation since 1983 pub. Titan (London) 1996 
 The Erotic Anime Movie Guide (with Jonathan Clements) pub Titan (London) 1998 
 Hayao Miyazaki: Master of Japanese Animation pub Stone Bridge Press (Berkeley, CA) 1999 
 The Anime Encyclopedia: A Guide to Japanese Animation Since 1917 (with Jonathan Clements) pub Stone Bridge Press (Berkeley, CA) 2001 ; 2nd edition 2006, 
 500 Manga Heroes and Villains pub Collins & Brown (London) 2006 , Barron's Educational (USA) 
 500 Essential Anime You Must Own  pub Ilex (Lewes) 2008, Collins Design (USA) 2009, 
 Manga Cross-Stitch: Make Your Own Graphic Art Needlework, pub Ilex (Lewes) 2009, Andrews McMeel (USA) 2009, 
 The Art of Osamu Tezuka: God of Manga pub Ilex (Lewes) 2009,  Abrams ComicArts (USA) 2009, 
 Manga Impact: The World of Japanese Animation pub Phaidon Press (New York, NY) 2010,  
 A Brief History of Manga pub Ilex (Lewes) 2014,  
 How to Draw Manga Made Easy pub Flame Tree (London) 2015,  
 Drawing Basics Made Easy pub Flame Tree (London) 2015,

References

External links 
 Animefringe: June 2005 – Reviews – Hayao Miyazaki: Master of Japanese Animation
 Helen McCarthy's blog
 
 Interview with Helen McCarthy

1951 births
Anime and manga critics
British journalists
Living people
British women journalists
British media critics
British women non-fiction writers
British textile artists
British women artists
Women textile artists
Embroidery designers
20th-century British non-fiction writers
21st-century British non-fiction writers
20th-century British women writers
21st-century British women writers
Harvey Award winners